Memonic is a free web-based notetaking application that allows users to save and organize information while conducting research online and offline. A clip may be a full webpage or webpage excerpt, a document or document excerpt, a text note, or a screenshot. 

Memonic is based in Switzerland and was launched in November 2010. The company was co-founded by the current CEO Dorian Seiz.

Product characteristics
Memonic offers a full online notetaking application for a number of platforms. Content may be clipped using a range of bookmarklets and extensions for various browsers or by using the desktop application. The online application works on any standard browser.

Notes can also be added by email, or composed from scratch. Notes can be organized in folders, edited, commented and searched. A user can also create groups to share notes and collaborate with a closed user group.

Memonic operates on a freemium model with a free plan limited to 100 notes along with a paid plan for unlimited notes.

References

External links
 

Note-taking software
Web annotation
Cloud storage
Proprietary cross-platform software
Free note-taking software